Lubimbi people are scattered all over Africa, mostly found in Southern Africa. Notable countries being South Africa, Zimbabwe, Mozambique, Zambia, Democratic Republic of Congo, Tanzania and Uganda.

History 
The Lubimbi people are a clan based on their male common ancestry, Mhlabawadabuka the son of Gasa and Manukuza's [Soshangane] half brother. Originally they belonged to the Nguni (AMaLala) clan, which is one of the original clans in Africa. Population growth and land pressure led to population migration and social conflicts which led to formation of smaller clans. The Lubimbi clan was founded by Mhlabawadabuka, who tried to achieve independence by creating his own tribe. Trouble arose between him and his elder brother Manukuza [Soshangane] and the later was driven away. He then joined Zwangendaba with his followers, and they moved northwards and later settled in the Zambezi valley where they split up in 1834. Mhlabawadabuka remained in the lower Zambezi area, the present day Lubimbi area in Binga (Matebeleland North), with his headquarters near the Lubimbi hot springs.  Zwangendaba crossed Zambezi river in 1835 with some of Mhlabawadabuka's children, which is how the Lubimbi clan's division and journey across Africa started. Some migrated to present day Uganda, while some settled in Kenya, Tanzania and the Democratic Republic of Congo. Mhlabawadabuka's father Gasa, the son of Langa, son of Xaba (King and founder of the Ndwandwe tribe), occupied the Mkhuze region with his brother Zwide settled in Magudu Transvaal Province. They were mainly based in present-day Pongola (Mhlabuyalingana area) near Lebombo Mountains towards Eswatini (KwaZulu Natal), South Africa. They were depleted due to family misunderstandings and uprisings.

Economy 
Lubimbi traditional economy is based on mixed agriculture, with maize being the staple food. They were good axe makers and fishermen, who also made canoes. Again they were great navigators on both land and lakes.

Culture 
Lubimbi people have strong acknowledgement of their ancestors, who are believed to have been strong traditional healers. Queen Ntombazi, Langa kaXaba's wife and Gasa's mother was a witch doctor.

List of Mhlabawadabuka's ancestors 
Nxala
Mthethwa (The founder of the Mthethwa clan) {Mpanza and Masondo were his younger brothers}
Nyambose
Khubazi
Ndlovu
Simamane (Wengwe)
Madungu [B1625-D1753]
Xaba [B1650-1771] (The founder of the Ndwandwe clan, he was also known as Ndwandwe)
Langa (Mkhatshwa/Zimangele)
Gasa (Ndindane)

References 

http://www.cambridge.org/tn/download_file/788948/

Ethnic groups in Africa